Body Guards is a 2000 Italian comedy film directed by Neri Parenti.

Plot
Fabio Leone and Paolo Pecora are two police officers of Rome which, together with the careless Neapolitan Ciro Marmotta, are fired from the barracks to have scuppered the plan to capture a secret agent. Fortunately the three friends manage to enlist in a guardhouse more specialized, which involves the VIPs protection in Italy and foreign countries, on a visit to Rome. But the three friends, who now also joined Romolo: the scullion of the bodyguards' association, always combine a lot of troubles.

Cast
 Christian De Sica: Fabio Leone
 Massimo Boldi: Paolo Pecora
 Biagio Izzo: Ciro Marmotta
 Enzo Salvi: Romolo "Er Cobra"
 Sebastiano Lo Monaco: Codispoti
 Megan Gale: herself
 Victoria Silvstedt: herself
 Luca Laurenti: himself
 Emanuele De Nicolò: Savino Incoronato
 Donata Frisini: Teresa Incoronato
 Paolo Conticini: maniac
 Anna Falchi: herself
 Cindy Crawford: herself / her double
 Isa Gallinelli: women sadomaso
 Peter Boom: Ambassador
 Alessandra Casella: Beauty Farm Director
 Nicoletta Boris: Beauty Farm doctor
 Riccardo Parisio Perrotti: Carabiniere
 Cristina Parodi: herself
 Gigi Marzullo: himself
 Bruce McGuire: Manager Cindy Crawford
 Demo Morselli: himself

References

External links

Italian comedy films
Films directed by Neri Parenti
Films scored by Bruno Zambrini
2000 films
2000 comedy films
2000s Italian-language films